Bund für Umwelt und Naturschutz Deutschland (BUND) is a German non-governmental organisation (NGO) dedicated to preserving nature and protecting the environment. The name means "German Federation for the Environment and Nature Conservation". Its subtitle Friends of the Earth Germany indicates that BUND is a member organisation of the international network Friends of the Earth (FoE).

General facts 

With about 660,000 members and supporters the BUND is one of the biggest environmental organizations in Germany. It is also formally accredited by the Federal Republic of Germany and therefore has to be officially included if an encroachment into nature is being planned. In 2020, the organization gathered €41.1million mainly from member fees (71%).

The federal organization has its office located in Berlin and is represented by its president Hubert Weiger. There are 2,200 local groups and, like Germany itself, the BUND is divided into 16 state organisations. There are up to 20 working parties specialised such as in law, water, waste, health, forest, energy, and gene technology; everyone can participate. The working parties often include renowned scientist and participate in official parliament hearings, comment on new laws and develop ecologic concepts. Moreover, the expert knowledge is widely spread through workshops and brochures.

All members of the BUND under the age of 27 are automatically members of the youth organisation BUNDjugend.

The BUND logo symbolises the earth as a green ball held by two protecting hands.

History 

The BUND was founded on 20 July 1975, as a federation of already existing regional groups. The BUND's co-founders were Horst Stern, Bernhard Grzimek, Herbert Gruhl, Enoch zu Guttenberg, Hubert Weinzierl and 16 others including Bodo Manstein and  Gerhard Thielcke.

The original name „Bund für Natur- und Umweltschutz Deutschland (BNUD)“ was changed in 1977 for better readability.

In 1989 the BUND became a member of Friends of the Earth International.

In 1990 five Associations were founded in East Germany.

BUND was founding member of the Berlin Energy Table which successfully pushed for a Referendum on the recommunalization of energy supply in Berlin in 2013.  The referendum however failed to obtain a sufficient number of yes votes despite a strong majority amongst those that did vote.

Publications
 The Meat Atlas is an annual report on meat consumption and the meat industry published in cooperation with Heinrich Böll Foundation, Friends of the Earth and Le Monde diplomatique.

External links 

 BUND Homepage
 BUNDjugend homepage (in German)
 Friends of the Earth Europe Homepage
 Friends of the Earth International Homepage

References

Environmental organisations based in Germany
Friends of the Earth
Organizations established in 1975
1975 establishments in Germany
Nature conservation in Germany
Deutscher Naturschutzring